Timur Kalizhanov (born 16 April 1993) is a Russian-Kazakh professional footballer who is currently a free agent. His latest professional club was Neman Grodno. Kalizhanov represented Kazakhstan at 2013 CIS Cup. Before that, he represented Russia at several junior competitions.

External links
 Profile at pressball.by
 
 interview with Kalizhanov
 interview with Kalizhanov
 interview with Kalizhanov

1993 births
People from Nakhodka
Living people
Russian footballers
Kazakhstani footballers
FC Dynamo Moscow reserves players
FC Neman Grodno players
Kazakhstani expatriate footballers
Expatriate footballers in Belarus
Association football midfielders
Belarusian Premier League players
Sportspeople from Primorsky Krai